The 2015–16 Tennessee Tech Golden Eagles men's basketball team represented Tennessee Technological University during the 2015–16 NCAA Division I men's basketball season. The Golden Eagles, led by fifth year head coach Steve Payne, played their home games at the Eblen Center and were members of the East Division of the Ohio Valley Conference. They finished the season 19–12, 11–5 in OVC play to finish in a three way tie for second place in the East Division. They lost in the first round of the OVC tournament to Austin Peay. They were invited to the inaugural Vegas 16, which only had 8 teams, where they lost in the quarterfinals to Old Dominion.

Roster

Schedule

|-
!colspan=9 style=| Non-conference regular season

|-
!colspan=9 style=| Ohio Valley Conference regular season

|-
!colspan=9 style=| Ohio Valley Conference tournament

|-
!colspan=9 style=| Vegas 16

References

Tennessee Tech Golden Eagles men's basketball seasons
Tennessee Tech
Tennessee Tech Golden Eagles men's basketball
Tennessee Tech Golden Eagles men's basketball
Tennessee Tech